Torbjörn Samuelsson (born 1973) is a strongman competitor from Sweden, and is the younger brother of 1998 World's Strongest Man winner Magnus Samuelsson. Torbjörn is a two-time winner of Sweden's Strongest Man in 1998 & 2002. Torbjörn competed in the 2000, 2001 and 2002 World's Strongest Man competitions, but never qualified for the finals.

References

Swedish strength athletes
1974 births
Living people